Joseph T. Angelo (16 February, 1896 – 23 July, 1978) was an American veteran of World War I and recipient of the Distinguished Service Cross. Prior to joining the U.S. Army, Angelo worked for the Du Pont Powderworks, and was later involved in the Bonus Army movement of the 1930s.

War service
Angelo was awarded the Distinguished Service Cross for his actions during the Meuse–Argonne offensive on September 26, 1918, as the Colonel's orderly (batman) with 304th Tank Brigade, commanded by future General George S. Patton During the battle, in an exposed position Patton was seriously wounded by a machine gun. Showing great courage under enemy fire, Angelo dragged Patton to safety. He had thus saved the life of a man who would one day become an American legend. The citation for his DSC reads:

In the spring of 1919, an interview appeared in American newspapers in which Patton declared Angelo "without doubt the bravest man in the American Army. I have never seen his equal." According to the interviewer, Angelo began "blushing furiously" as he related the following details:

Great Depression and Bonus Army
In 1932, while Patton continued his path on his famous military career, Angelo had returned to civilian life. He was unemployed and suffering along with many other veterans from the effects of the Great Depression. As a result, he joined the Bonus Army movement of First World War veterans demanding monetary compensation for their roles in the war. The particular issue was that these veterans had been promised compensation but they were not due to receive it until 1948 (the money was eventually awarded in 1936). Given the realities of the depression, veterans such as Angelo demanded the money be paid immediately.

The veterans marched on Washington D.C., setting up camps in order to protest against the administration of President Herbert Hoover.

References

United States Army personnel of World War I
United States Army soldiers
Recipients of the Distinguished Service Cross (United States)
1896 births
1978 deaths
People from Camden, New Jersey